Shamsunnahar Mahmud (c. 1908 — April 10, 1964) was a writer, politician and educator in Bengal during the early 20th century. She was a leader of the women's rights movement in Bengal pioneered by Begum Rokeya. Shamsunnahar Hall of the University of Dhaka was named after her.

Early life and education
Mahmud was born in 1908 in North Guthuma village, in what is now Parshuram Upazila of Feni District, Bangladesh. Her father, Mohammad Nurullah, was a munsiff. Khan Bahadur Abdul Aziz was her grandfather. Her brother, Habibullah Bahar Chowdhury was a politician.

Mahmud started her studies at Dr. Khastagir Government Girls' School in Chittagong, and matriculated in 1926 as a private candidate. She received her I.A. in 1928 and B.A. in 1932 at the Diocesan College of Calcutta. In 1942, she completed her M.A. in Bengali literature. After her studies she joined the women's rights movement led by Begum Rokeya.

Career

Mahmud started her career as a teacher of Bengali literature at Lady Brabourne College. She worked as secretary to the Nikhil Banga Muslim Mahila Samity (All Bengal Muslim Women's Society). She visited Turkey and the Middle East as a representative of East Pakistan in 1952. She was elected member of the National Assembly in 1962.

In 1961, she initiated the establishment of "The Centre for the Rehabilitation of Disabled Children".  She led a delegation to the International Council of Women in Colombo and joined the International Friendship Organization as Asia's regional director.

Personal life
She married Wahiduddin Mahmud in 1927. He was the Surgeon General of then East Pakistan. Together they had two sons, Mamun Mahmud, a martyred freedom fighter during the 1971 Liberation war of Bangladesh, and Mainuddin Mahmud, a cricketer, and sports enthusiast.

Works
Mahmud's first poem was published in a juvenile monthly magazine "Angur". She edited the women's sections of the magazines "Nauroj"and "Atmashakti". Together with her brother, Habibullah, she edited the magazine Bulbul (1933) which was published from Kolkata. She wrote books which included Punyamayi (1925), Phulbagicha (1935), Begum Mahal (1936), Roquia Jibani (1937; The first biography of Begum Rokeya), Shishur Shiksa (1939), Amar Dekha Turaska (1956) and Nazrulke Jeman Dekhechhi  (1958).

Legacy
After Mahmud's death, a women's hall of the University of Dhaka was named Shamsunnahar Hall. She was awarded Independence Day Award in 1981 by the Government of Bangladesh for her contribution to social work.

References

1900s births
1964 deaths
Bengali writers
Indian women's rights activists
Recipients of the Independence Day Award
People from Feni District
Recipients of Begum Rokeya Padak
Honorary Fellows of Bangla Academy
Women members of the Jatiya Sangsad
20th-century Bangladeshi women politicians